The 34th Annual 2008 Metro Manila Film Festival started from December 25, 2008, to January 7, 2009.

This year marks the return of the Escalera brothers in Iskul Bukol 20 Years After (Ungasis and Escaleras Adventure) and the hardworking mother, Ina Montecillo in Ang Tanging Ina Ninyong Lahat.

Compared to last year's nine official entries, however, this year has only eight, all of which are being shown simultaneously during the 10-day run of the film fest. The lineup includes four comedy movies, two dramatic flicks, a horror trilogy and a digital animated film. It is expected to run from December 25, 2008, to January 7, 2009. All official entries are open on Christmas Day.

Viva Films' Baler, which aims to retell a contentious event of the Philippine revolution that happened in the church of San Luis de Tolosa in Baler, Aurora from July 1998 to June 1899, won ten awards including the Best Picture, Best Actress for Anne Curtis, Best Director for Mark Meily and the Gatpuno Antonio J. Villegas Cultural Awards among others.

The entry with the second most awards was the animated film Dayo: Sa Mundo ng Elementalia, which won four awards including the Best Visual Effects for Robert Quilao, Best Musical Score for Jessie Lasaten, Best Theme Song entitled "Lipad" written by Jessie Lasaten and Artemio Abad Jr., and performed by Lea Salonga, as long as the Best Sound Production for Albert Idioma and Wally Dellosa.

This year's box office top grossers, Star Cinema's Ang Tanging Ina N'yong Lahat and the OctoArts Films-M-Zet Productions-APT Entertainment collaboration Iskul Bukol 20 Years After won Second and Third Festival's Best Picture awards respectively.

Entries
All eight films included in the competition are being simultaneously shown from December 25, 2008.

Awards
The awards night of 2008 Metro Manila Film Festival was held on December 27, 2008, at Harbor Garden Tent, Sofitel Philippine Plaza, Manila. The criteria that were used in the selection were: story, creativity, commercial viability, Filipino cultural values, global appeal and innovativeness. Historical film Baler won ten awards, including the Best Picture and Best Actress for Anne Curtis. Animated film Dayo: Sa Mundo ng Elementalia received four awards, including the Best Theme Song, "Lipad", performed by Lea Salonga. Sexy-comedy film One Night Only got two awards while Magkaibigan, Desperadas 2, and Shake, Rattle & Roll X won one each. Iskul Bukol: 20 Years After and Ang Tanging Ina N'yong Lahat were the only two entries that won nothing besides the Third and Second Best Pictures respectively.

Multiple awards

Ceremony information

Award winners
Curtis won her first-ever acting award for her portrayal of Baler lass Feliza Reyes in love with a Spanish-Filipino trooper Celso Resurreccion (Jericho Rosales) in the historic siege. She states: "The fact that I was up against veteran actresses, who have won numerous awards in the past, made this trophy even more meaningful..." She competed with veteran actresses Ai-Ai delas Alas (Ang Tanging Ina N'yong Lahat), Maricel Laxa and Dawn Zulueta (both for Magkaibigan), among others, for the Best Actress title. She adds: "This is also for Echo (Rosales' nickname), who also worked really hard for this film. He's one of the best actors I know" as she told the Philippine Daily Inquirer shortly after the awards ceremony held at the Sofitel Hotel in Pasay.

In addition, Meily earned his second MMFF Best Director award after winning the same plum for Crying Ladies back in 2003. His wife Lee also took home her first MMFF award. Christopher de Leon, meanwhile, received his eighth festival Best Actor award, the most by any artist in its 34-year history, for a role inspired by the late Rudy Fernandez in the Maverick Films drama Magkaibigan opposite last year's awardee Jinggoy Estrada.

Comedian-TV host Manilyn Reynes pulled a surprise when she was named Best Supporting Actress for her portrayal as a lesbian talent coordinator in Canary Films sex comedy One Night Only, which also won Best Original Story for its director Jose Javier Reyes. Reyes states: "She's a last minute replacement..." as he accepted the award in Manilyn's behalf. He adds: "I did not regret asking her to be a part of this film."

Newcomer Robert Villar, better known in the fantasy series Dyesebel as the mermaid's trusted child friend "Buboy", won Best Child Performer in Regal Films horror franchise Shake, Rattle & Roll X. Regal's other festival entry, Desperadas 2, on the other hand, also won one award: Best Make-Up for Noli Villalobos.

Reception

Critical
As box-office receipts for the 2008 Metro Manila Film Festival (MMFF) showed substantial growth over the previous year, questions concerning credibility and film quality issues remain. In an article in the Philippine Daily Inquirer, writer Rita Asilo stated that the MMFF organizers' move of encouraging producers to make more movies by giving tax-based incentives even to poorly made films could be viewed as a bad example. She also states that moviegoers cannot be educated by equating noble intention or commercial viability with quality. If the trend continues, more moviegoers would insist that the stranglehold that MMFF has on play dates and theatrical distribution during the Christmas season should end. Ultimately, the festival generated a grand total of P450,000,000 in ticket sales, an all-time record high.

Box Office gross

References

External links

34th Metro Manila Film Festival Awards Winners

Metro Manila Film Festival
MMFF
MMFF
MMFF
MMFF
MMFF